Hubnyk is a Ukrainian village in the Haisyn Raion (district) of Vinnytsia Oblast (province).

Demographics
According to the 2001 census, most of the population of the village of Hubnik were Ukrainian (97.79%), with a minority of Russian speakers (1.99%).

Notable residents
 Edward Jełowicki, Polish military Colonel, inventor
 Aleksander Jełowicki, Polish insurgent, publisher and priest

References 

Villages in Haisyn Raion